The Branco River (Engl: White River) is the principal affluent of the Rio Negro from the north.

Basin
The river drains the Guayanan Highlands moist forests ecoregion.
It is enriched by many streams from the Tepui highlands which separate Venezuela and Guyana from Brazil. Its two upper main tributaries are the Uraricoera and the Takutu. The latter almost links its sources with those of the Essequibo; during floods headwaters of the Branco and those of the Essequibo are connected, allowing a level of exchange in the aquatic fauna (such as fish) between the two systems.

The Branco flows nearly south, and finds its way into the Negro through several channels and a chain of lagoons similar to those of the latter river.

Discharge

Average, minimum and maximum discharge of the Branco River at near mouth. Period from 1998 to 2022.

Water chemistry
As suggested by its name, the Branco (literally "white" in Portuguese) has whitish water that may appear almost milky due to the inorganic sediments it carries. It is traditionally considered a whitewater river, although the major seasonal fluctuations in its physico-chemical characteristics makes a classification difficult and some consider it clearwater. Especially the river's upper parts at the headwaters are clear and flow through rocky country, leading to the suggestion that sediments mainly originate from the lower parts. Furthermore, its chemistry and color may contradict each other compared to the traditional Amazonian river classifications. The Branco River has pH 6–7 and low levels of dissolved organic carbon.

Alfred Russel Wallace mentioned the coloration in "On the Rio Negro", a paper read at the 13 June 1853 meeting of the Royal Geographical Society, in which he said: "[The Rio Branco] is white to a remarkable degree, its waters being actually milky in appearance". Alexander von Humboldt attributed the color to the presence of silicates in the water, principally mica and talc. There is a visible contrast with the waters of the Rio Negro at the confluence of the two rivers. The Rio Negro is a blackwater river with dark tea-colored acidic water (pH 3.5–4.5) that contains high levels of dissolved organic carbon.

River capture
Until approximately 20,000 years ago the headwaters of the Branco River flowed not into the Amazon, but via the Takutu Graben in the Rupununi area of Guyana towards the Caribbean. Currently in the rainy season much of the Rupununi area floods, with water draining both to the Amazon (via the Branco River) and the Essequibo River.

Citations

Notes

References
 Encyclopædia Britannica Online.com: "Branco River" . retrieved 19 September 2009.

Rivers of Roraima
Tributaries of the Rio Negro (Amazon)
Boa Vista, Roraima
Guayana Highlands